DSG may stand for:

Companies and organisations
 Caldera Digital Research Systems Group, a former department of Caldera
 Defence Support Group, the Trading Fund of the UK Ministry of Defence
 Delaware State Guard, the inactive state defense force of Delaware
 Democratic Study Group, a legislative service organization (LSO) in the United States House of Representatives
 Deutsche Schlafwagen- und Speisewagengesellschaft, the German Sleeper and Dining Car Company 
 Dick's Sporting Goods, a sporting goods retailer
 DSG International (retailer), Dixons Stores Group, a European retailer
 DSG International Ltd., a Hong Kong-based manufacturer
 Novell Desktop Systems Group, a former department of Novell

Health
 Dacryoscintigraphy, a nuclear medicine scan of the lacrimal system
 Desogestrel, a progestin used in birth control pills

Science and technology
 Lunar Gateway, a crewed cislunar space station planned by NASA, formerly Deep Space Gateway
 DOCSIS Set-top Gateway, a technical specification
 Direct-shift gearbox, an electronically-controlled, dual-clutch, multiple-shaft, automatic gearbox

Other uses
 David Shankle Group, a heavy metal band
 Deutsche Schule Genf, a German international school near Geneva, Switzerland
 Dick's Sporting Goods Park, a soccer-specific stadium near Denver, Colorado
 Diocesan School for Girls (disambiguation), various schools
 Direct-Shift Gearbox, a type of automotive gearbox from Volkswagen Group
 Dame of Saint Gregory, female variant of class in one of the orders of knighthood of the Holy See